Nazmi Bari (13 November 1929 – 20 September 2008) was a Turkish national tennis player.

References

1929 births
Sportspeople from Istanbul
Turkish male tennis players
2008 deaths
Burials at Feriköy Cemetery
20th-century Turkish people